Douglas Martin or Doug Martin may refer to:

as Douglas
 Douglas Martin (born 1961), American director of the American Repertory Ballet
 Douglas A. Martin (born 1973), American poet, novelist and short-story writer
 Douglas J. Martin (1927–2010), New Zealander leader in The Church of Jesus Christ of Latter-day Saints
 J. Douglas Martin (1927–2020), Canadian Bahá'í, member of the Universal House of Justice, author
 Douglas Wayne Martin (1951-1993), Branch Davidian

as Doug
 Doug Martin (American football coach) (born 1963), American football coach at New Mexico State
 Doug Martin (defensive end) (born 1957), American former football defensive end
 Doug Martin (golfer) (born 1966), American professional golfer
 Doug Martin (running back) (born 1989), American football running back 
 Doug Martin (swimmer) (born 1955), Canadian Olympic swimmer
 Doug Martin (basketball) (1936–2014), American college basketball coach